

l

lab-lai
labetalol (INN)
labetuzumab (INN)
Labid (Warner Chilcott)
labradimil (USAN)
Lac-Hydrin
lacidipine (INN)
lacosamide (INN)
Lacrisert
lactalfate (INN)
Lactated Ringer's solution
lactitol (INN)
lactuca virosa
lactulose (INN)
ladostigil (INN)
laflunimus (INN)
lafutidine (INN)
lagatide (INN)
lagociclovir (INN)
laidlomycin (INN)

lam-lan
Lamictal
lamifiban (INN)
Lamisil
lamivudine (INN)
lamotrigine (INN)
Lamprene
lamtidine (INN)
Lanabiotic
lanatoside C (INN)
landiolol (INN)
lanepitant (INN)
Laniazid
lanimostim (USAN)
lanoconazole (INN)
Lanophyllin
Lanorinal
lanoteplase (INN)
Lanoxicaps
Lanoxin
lanperisone (INN)
lanproston (INN)
lanreotide (INN)
lansoprazole (INN)
Lantrisul
Lantus (Sanofi-Aventis)

lap-lax
lapaquistat acetate (USAN)
lapatinib ditosylate (USAN)
lapirium chloride (INN)
laprafylline (INN)
lapuleucel-T (USAN)
laquinimod sodium (USAN)
larazotide (USAN)
Largon
Lariam
Larodopa
laromustine (USAN)
laropiprant (USAN)
Larotid
Laryng-O-Jet Kit
Laryngotracheal Anesthesia Kit
lasalocid (INN)
lasinavir (INN)
Lasix  (Sanofi-Aventis) redirects to furosemide
lasmiditan (INN)
latamoxef (INN)
latanoprost (INN)
latrepirdine (INN)
laudexium metilsulfate (INN)
lauralkonium chloride (INN)
laurcetium bromide (INN)
laurixamine (INN)
laurocapram (INN)
lauroguadine (INN)
laurolinium acetate (INN)
lauromacrogol 400 (INN)
lavoltidine (INN)
Laxilose

laz
lazabemide (INN)